Buddleja  'Silver Frost' is a hybrid cultivar raised by Prof. Michael Dirr and his team at the University of Georgia, USA, from a crossing of 'Lochinch' and an unnamed variety. 'Silver Frost' grows rapidly to a height of about 2.0 m and is distinguished by its silver-grey foliage allied with upright panicles of pure white flowers. , 'Silver Frost' is only cultivated in the US and Canada. Hardiness: USDA zones 5–9.

References

Buddleja hybrids and cultivars